Than Sadet–Ko Pha-ngan is a national park in southern Thailand, with an area of 26,866 rai ~  mostly on the island Pha-ngan. The park was established on 22 November 2018. It covers parts of the  Ko Pha-ngan island.

The park is named after the royal visit of Rama V, Than Sadet (lit. Royal River) who came to the island to visit the waterfall first in 1888, then returned as many as fourteen times over the next 21 years. Rama V's initials can still be seen carved in a commemorative rock near the estuary of the river where the waterfall empties into the sea at Than Sadet Bay. The river itself forms a series of waterfalls and rock pools along its 2.5 km length, providing excellent trekking possibilities for the experienced. Several other Thai monarchs have visited the site including the late King Rama IX.

Khao Ra is both the highest elevation of the park as well as of the whole island of Pha-ngan, peaking at 635 m above sea level.

In addition to the forest on Pha-ngan itself, the park also includes several small islands north and east of Pha-ngan, including Wao and Hin Bai archipelago.

References

External links

National Park, Wildlife and Plant Conservation Department

National parks of Thailand
Geography of Surat Thani province
Tourist attractions in Surat Thani province